Schilling Playhouse is an American/British 30 minute anthology series produced for syndication by Edwin H. Knopf.  The first season's episodes were filmed in the United States, and episodes thereafter filmed in the UK. Approximately 40 episodes were made.

Charles Drake was the host, and among the guest stars were Patricia Neal, Peter O'Toole, Bert Lahr, Gary Merrill, Mel Ferrer, Donald Pleasence, Leslie Dwyer, Lois Maxwell, and Kim Hunter. It was one of the first major television appearances for actress Connie Hines, in the first season episode "Mean Mountain".

Originally planned to run on CBS, Rendezvous was replaced by Desilu Playhouse, which led to Rendezvous'''s being put into syndication. The Schilling division of McCormick & Company bought Rendezvous in 1959. Renamed The Schilling Playhouse'', the series was initially broadcast on KABC-TV in Los Angeles and KRON-TV in San Francisco.

References

External links
Schilling Playhouse at CTVA

1958 American television series debuts
1960 American television series endings
1958 British television series debuts
1960 British television series endings
1950s American anthology television series
1960s American anthology television series
1950s British drama television series
1960s British drama television series
Black-and-white American television shows
Black-and-white British television shows
1950s British anthology television series
1960s British anthology television series
First-run syndicated television programs in the United States